Narayanganj District is a district in central Bangladesh which is a part of the Dhaka Division. It is smallest district in Bangladesh.It is home to the ancient city of Sonargaon and is one of the oldest industrial districts in the country. The district lies on the banks of the Shitalakshya River and the Meghna River. It is an industrial hub and plays an important part in the country's jute trade, plant processing and sector. It is nicknamed the "Dundee of Bangladesh" due to the presence of many jute mills.

History
Narayanganj had the same history as much of the rest of the Dhaka area. Formerly ruled by the Palas and Senas, the region became part of the Muslim Bengal Sultanate in the 14th century. Sonargaon, capital of Bengal during the reign of Isa Khan, is in the district. Later the region was taken over by the Mughals as the Bengal Subah. The district is named after Bicon Lal Pandey, a Hindu religious leader who was also known as Benur Thakur or Lakshmi Narayan Thakur. Pandey acquired ownership of the region from the British East India Company in 1766 after the Battle of Plassey. He declared the marketplaces on the banks of the Shitalakshya river as endowed property to pay for expenses for the worship of Narayan. Subsequently, the region was named Narayanganj.

Important developments
 The post office was established in 1866.
 The Narayanganj municipality was officially founded on 8 September 1876.
 Dhaka–Narayanganj telegraph service was set up in 1877.
 Telephony was introduced by the Bank of Bengal in 1882.

It grew in importance in the seventeenth and eighteenth century, due to the influx of the Portuguese and the English. The first to develop was the west bank of Shitalakshya. Narayanganj only became important in the nineteenth century, when the Rally Brothers started a company exporting jute to the west in 1830, aided by a company from Assam. By 1908, 18 European companies, and two Indian companies were trading in jute from Calcutta.

With the formation of Pakistan in 1947, the economy transformed from being mainly a jute production to include jute milling due to the location of most existing jute mills in India. This followed the establishment of a number of mills in and around Narayanganj that gave the local economy a great boost.

During the War of Independence, the Pakistan Army massacred 139 people in Fatulla Thana on 29 November 1971. Eight days earlier, members of the freedom fighters fought the Pakistan Army in which one fighter was killed.

Formerly a sub-district of the Dhaka District, Narayanganj became a district on 15 February 1984.

Administrative areas
Narayanganj Zila consists of 5 upazilas (Narayanganj Sadar, Bandor, Rupganj, Sonargaon and Araihazar), subdivided into 47 unions and 827 mauzas. The areas and populations (at the 2011 Census) of the upazilas are:

There are also 7 police stations here, which are: Narayanganj Sadar, Bandor, Fatulla, Siddhirganj, Rupganj, Sonargaon and Araihazar. All the upazilas have more or less similar characteristics.

Administration
 Mayor of Narayanganj City Corporation: Dr. Salina Hayat Ivy
 Chairman of Zila Porishod: Babu Chandan Shil
 Deputy Commissioner (DC): Md. Manjurul Hafiz
 Chairman Of Bandar Upazila: M A RASHID
 Chairman Of Sonargaon Upazila: Advocate Shamsul Islam Bhuiyan

Economy
The district pioneered in merchandising yarn and dyeing items. The cottage industry, like weaving, is abundant in this district. International trading, import and export business, shipyard brickfield, etc. create employment opportunities to the people which facilitate additional income to the household population. The small and medium industries of cotton are increasing day-by-day which fills the employment aids to the local people. The rural economy of Narayanganj is mostly based on agriculture.
According to Bangladesh Bank, the district is ranked third in nation in terms of gross national income (GNI) and possession of wealth. Now-a-days Network marketing is the best position here. So, the economy of Narayanganj has been increasing day-by-day and also contributing to the nation building initiatives.

Demographics

According to the 2011 Bangladesh census, Narayanganj District had a population of 2,948,217, of which 1,521,438 were males and 1,426,779 females. Rural population was 1,959,261 (66.46%) while the urban population was 988,956 (33.54%). Narayanganj district had a literacy rate of 57.10% for the population 7 years and above: 59.48% for males and 54.56% for females.

Religion

The district has 95.06% Muslims and 4.89% Hindus. The district of Narayanganj has 3080 mosques, 269 temples, 10 churches and 4 Buddhist temples. Moreover; there is an institute called 'Narayanganj Institute of Islam', which conducts research activities on comparative religions.

Places of interest
 The ancient city of Sonargaon was the capital of Isa Khan, a medieval ruler of Bengal. Sonargaon is also famous for producing muslin, a delicate and fine cloth made from cotton.
 The Dhaka-Narayanganj-Demra (DND) embankment surrounds Narayanganj district and protects it from flooding.
Shaira Garden near Nazimuddin Bhuiyan Degree College at madanpur.
 The Bangladesh Engineering and Ship Building Corporation at Sonakanda on the east bank of the Shitalakshya River, established in 1925.
 Zinda Park
 12th Rabiul Awal The Holy Eid-E-Milannobi( salllalhu alaihi oa sallam) Jashne Juluse Rally. Which was first held in the country from Baitul Ijjot Jame Mosque, Near Narayanganj Nagar Vhaban Led By by 40th Descendent of Beloved Prophet (Sallallahu alaihi oa sallam),15th centuries Mujadded, Imame Rabbani, Gause Jaman, Hazratul Allama Syed Abed Shah al-madani (rd.) Millions of people gathered here on this specific day to celebrate MLADNNOBI(SM)Birth Day of Beloved Prophet Sallallahu alaihi oa sallam. Now it has become one of the biggest Jashne Julus Rally in the world, leaded by Allama Syed Bahadur shah, President-Bangladesh Ahle Sunnat Wal Jamat President, Chairmen- Islamic Front Bangladesh, Pir Saheb- Imame Rabbani Darbar sharif (Hajiganj,Chandpur).
Abedia Bahadurshahiya Mujaddediya Khanka Sharif & Baitul Ijjat Jame Mosque Beside Narayanganj City Corporation (It has established by 40 Descendent of Beloved Prophet (Sallallahu alaihi oa sallam),15th centuries Mujadded, Imame Rabbani, Gause Jaman, Hazratul Allama Syed Abed Shah al-madani (rd.). Now his 3rd Son - Allama Syed Bahadur shah, President-Bangladesh Ahle Sunnat Wal Jamat President, Chairmen- Islamic Front Bangladesh, Pir Saheb- Imame Rabbani Darbar sharif (Hajiganj,Chandpur) is leading this Khanka Sharif. Every Jumma prayer lots of devote comes to meet him and try to getting bless from him and ask Dua from Him.

Flora and fauna

Flora
Almost the whole of Narayanganj district lies on the meander flood plain. Most of this area is now flooded only by rain-water. Only minor areas near the Old Brahmaputra, Meghna, Shitalakshya and Dhaleswari rivers are affected by river water and receive fresh silt deposits. A wide variety of soils occurs in this district.

Fauna

Mammals
Mammals that are commonly seen in the district are Indian pipistrelle (Pipistrellus coromandra).

Birds
The most common birds of the district include doel, salik, crow and duck.

Fish
In the river, canal, beels, and ponds there are various kinds of fish, but because of water pollution, it is very hard to see fish in the river.

See also

Districts of Bangladesh

Notes

References

 
Districts of Dhaka Division
Districts of Bangladesh
Districts and regions of Greater Dhaka